Durango, Mexico, may refer to:

The state of Durango, one of the 32 component federal entities of the United Mexican States
Durango, Durango, capital city of the State of Durango (also known as "Victoria de Durango")

See also
 Durango (disambiguation)